Division No. 5 is one of eighteen census divisions in the province of Saskatchewan, Canada, as defined by Statistics Canada. It is located in the east-southeastern part of the province, bordering Manitoba. The most populous community in this division is Melville.

Demographics 

Census subdivisions 
The following census subdivisions (municipalities or municipal equivalents) are located within Saskatchewan's Division No. 5.

Cities
Melville

Towns

Bredenbury
Broadview
Churchbridge
Esterhazy
Fleming
Grenfell
Kipling
Langenburg
Lemberg
Moosomin
Rocanville
Saltcoats
Wapella
Whitewood
Wolseley

Villages

Atwater
Bangor
Dubuc
Duff
Fenwood
Gerald
Glenavon
Goodeve
Grayson
Killaly
MacNutt
Neudorf
Spy Hill
Stockholm
Tantallon
Waldron
Welwyn
Windthorst
Yarbo

Resort villages
Bird's Point
Melville Beach
West End

Rural municipalities

 RM No. 121 Moosomin
 RM No. 122 Martin
 RM No. 123 Silverwood
 RM No. 124 Kingsley
 RM No. 125 Chester
 RM No. 151 Rocanville
 RM No. 152 Spy Hill
 RM No. 153 Willowdale
 RM No. 154 Elcapo
 RM No. 155 Wolseley
 RM No. 181 Langenburg
 RM No. 183 Fertile Belt
 RM No. 184 Grayson
 RM No. 185 McLeod
 RM No. 211 Churchbridge
 RM No. 213 Saltcoats
 RM No. 214 Cana
 RM No. 215 Stanley

Indian reserves
 Cowessess First Nation
 Cowessess 73
 Kahkewistahaw First Nation
 Kahkewistahaw 72
 Ochapowace Nation
 Ochapowace 71
 Ochapowace 71-7
 Ochapowace 71-10
 Ochapowace 71-18
 Ochapowace 71-26
 Ochapowace 71-44
 Ochapowace 71-51
 Ochapowace 71-54
 Ochapowace 71-70
 Sakimay First Nation
 Little Bone 74B
 Sakimay 74
 Shesheep 74A

See also 
List of census divisions of Saskatchewan
List of communities in Saskatchewan

References

Division No. 5, Saskatchewan Statistics Canada

 
05